The Sicilian Girl is a 2008 Italian film directed by Marco Amenta. The film is inspired by the story of Rita Atria, a key witness in a major Mafia investigation in Sicily.

Synopsis
Beginning in 1985 in Balata, Sicily, the eleven-year-old Rita Mancuso witnessed the assassination of her beloved father Don Michele by a rival Mafia family. Six years later, her brother is killed by the Mafia as well. Determined to avenge the murders, she decides to break the code of silence and goes to an anti-Mafia prosecutor in Palermo with her detailed diaries to be used as evidence. Being forced to flee her village, she is put into witness protection and transferred to a safe house in Rome.

Reception
For The Sicilian Girl, Amenta received a David di Donatello nomination for Best New Director. According to a New York Times movie review, the film is hobbled by sluggish direction by Amenta, who previously addressed Atria’s story in his 1997 documentary, One Girl Against the Mafia: Diary of a Sicilian Rebel.

Rita Atria's family have condemned the film; Atria's niece, Vita Maria Atria, said that "I don't believe that any of this helps to commemorate my aunt, but only serves economic ends which I really do not consider appropriate."

Cast
 Veronica D'Agostino as Rita Mancuso
 Miriana Faja as Young Rita
 Francesco Casisa as Vito
 Carmelo Galati as Rita's brother
 Gérard Jugnot as Prosecutor
 Marcello Mazzarella as Don Michele
 Mario Pupella as Zio Salvo
 Primo Reggiani as Lorenzo
 Lorenzo Rosone as Young Vito
 Lucia Sardo as Rita's mother

References

External links
 
 

2008 films
Italian crime drama films
2000s Italian-language films
Films set in Rome
Films about the Sicilian Mafia
Crime films based on actual events
Films set in Sicily
Films shot in Italy
Films with screenplays by Sergio Donati
Films about witness protection